The Caméra d'Or ("Golden Camera") is an award of the Cannes Film Festival for the best first feature film presented in one of the Cannes' selections (Official Selection, Directors' Fortnight or International Critics' Week).
The prize, created in 1978 by Gilles Jacob, is awarded during the Festival's Closing Ceremony by an independent jury.

Criteria
The rules define first film as "the first feature film for theatrical screening (whatever the format; fiction, documentary or animation) of 60 minutes or more in length, by a director who has not made another film of 60 minutes or more in length and released theatrically."  Directors who have previously made only student thesis films or TV films can still compete in this category. The stated aim is to reveal a film "whose qualities emphasize the need to encourage the director to undertake a second film".

Caméra d'Or Winners

Caméra d'Or — Mention Spéciale
Some years, some films that didn't win the award have received a special mention for their outstanding quality as first features in Cannes. Also called Caméra d'Or — Mention or Caméra d'Or — Mention d'honneur.

References

External links
 Cannes Film Festival official website
 Cannes Film Festival at IMDb .

 
Lists of films by award
Cannes Film Festival
Directorial debut film awards
Awards established in 1978